All That Divides Us is a 2017 French thriller directed by Thierry Klifa.

Cast 

 Catherine Deneuve as Louise Keller
 Diane Kruger as Julia Keller
 Nekfeu as Ben Torres
 Nicolas Duvauchelle as Rodolphe Calavera
 Sébastien Houbani as Karim
 Michaël Cohen as Olivier
 Olivier Loustau as Daniel
 Brigitte Sy as Ben's mother
 Julia Faure as Patricia
 Elisabeth Mazev as Régine
 Virgile Bramly as Stéphane

References

External links 
 
 

2017 films
2017 thriller films
2010s French-language films
French thriller films
Films shot in France
Films set in France
2010s French films